Richard Leon Vizcaya (born January 7, 1976 in Caracas, Distrito Capital) is a Venezuelan judoka, who played for the lightweight category. He won two bronze medals for the 73 and 81 kg classes at the 2006 Pan American Judo Championships in Buenos Aires, Argentina, and at the 2008 Pan American Judo Championships in Miami, Florida.

Leon made his official debut for the 2004 Summer Olympics in Athens, where he lost the first preliminary match of men's lightweight class (73 kg), with an ippon and an osoto otoshi (big outer drop), to Moldova's Victor Bivol. Because his opponent advanced further into the semi-finals, Leon offered another shot for the bronze medal by entering the repechage bouts. Unfortunately, he was defeated in the first round by Iran's Hamed Malekmohammadi, who successfully scored an ippon and a sukui-nage (double leg takedown), at one minute and fifty-four seconds.

At the 2008 Summer Olympics in Beijing, Leon competed for the second time in men's 73 kg class. Leon lost the first preliminary match, by a koka and a golden score, to China's Si Rijigawa, although he received a penalty for false attack.

References

External links

NBC Olympics Profile

Venezuelan male judoka
Living people
Olympic judoka of Venezuela
Judoka at the 2004 Summer Olympics
Judoka at the 2008 Summer Olympics
Sportspeople from Caracas
1976 births
South American Games bronze medalists for Venezuela
South American Games medalists in judo
Competitors at the 2006 South American Games
20th-century Venezuelan people
21st-century Venezuelan people